Bollywood/Hollywood is a 2002 Canadian romantic comedy drama film directed by Deepa Mehta and starring Rahul Khanna and Lisa Ray.

The film was lighthearted, humorous, and family-oriented. The film pokes fun at traditional Indian stereotypes, as well as at Indian cinema (it features several Indian film-style song-and-dance numbers). Multiple award winning Indian actor Akshaye Khanna – the brother of Rahul Khanna – makes a cameo appearance in the film.

Plot
Rahul Seth, is a young and rich Indo-Canadian living in Toronto whose widowed mother is eager to get him married after the freak-accidental death of his white pop singer girlfriend, Kimberly. Rahul's mother disapproved of her son's relationship with a non-Indian woman. Furthermore, the mother proclaims that the impending wedding of her daughter Twinky and Bobby will not take place until Rahul has found himself an Indian bride first. The pressure mounts on Rahul as he finds out that Twinky must marry to preserve the family's reputation because she is pregnant.

Rahul goes to a bar and there meets Sue. Thinking she is a Spanish escort (non-sexual companion), he hires her to pose as his fiancée because she looks Indian. Rahul eventually discovers that Sue is actually Indian (her name is short for Sunita). Despite his initial anger at her lie, the two grow closer—due in no small part to a confidence boost Sue gave to Rahul's tormented younger brother, Govind, who incorrectly believes that no one cares about his welfare. Rahul and Sue eventually consider one another a fit match. Pleased, Mrs. Seth agrees to sanction Twinky's wedding.

Rahul and Sue grow more intimate, sharing stories about their pasts. It is revealed that Sue was once offered as a bride to the well-meaning but dim-witted professional wrestler Killer Khalsa; offended that her parents would even consider such a match, she has been playing mischief in revenge. This mischief is not fully explained, but her liking for it is suggested by her audacity. Sue is quite immune to social norms; she speaks bluntly to all, particularly to Rocky, Rahul's driver, who she knows (but does not reveal to others) is a famous drag queen.

The blossoming romance is shaken, when a drunken friend at Bobby's bachelor party states that Sue is a prostitute, and that he himself has paid her for sex in the past. Rahul is uncertain, causing Sue to be so hurt that he would question her honesty and integrity that she leaves him. He is forced to confess to his family that he never really courted Sue but merely bribed her to act the part of his fiancée. His mother is forced to postpone Twinky's wedding until Rahul can find a new bride, becoming despondent that Twinky's pregnancy will make the family social outcasts, for which Rahul calls her out for being a hypocrite. Twinky enters the room and tells her mother to stop crying, as Twinky and Bobby have eloped. Twinky thanks Rahul for doing so much to help her.

Prodded by Rocky ("Sue ma'am is special. Anyone who can keep a secret deserves the best"), by his insightful, Shakespeare-quoting grandmother and by the ghosts of his father and Kimberly, Rahul goes after Sue. In a balcony scene facilitated by Sue's father and mother, Rahul professes his true love to Sue, who abruptly leaves him standing outside her balcony. Rahul initially leaves in his limo, then tells Rocky to return to Sue's house, only to find that Sue has replaced Rocky in the driver's seat.

Cast
Rahul Khanna as Rahul Seth
Lisa Ray as Sue / Sunita Singh
Moushumi Chatterjee as Rahul's Mummy ji
Dina Pathak as Rahul's Grandma ji
Kulbhushan Kharbanda as Mr. Singh, Sue's Papa ji
Ranjit Chowdhry as Rocky
Jessica Paré as Kimberly
Rishma Malik as Twinky Seth
Jazz Mann as Bobby
Arjun Lombardi-Singh as Go / Govind
Neelam Mansingh as Mrs. Singh, Sue's Mama ji
Killer Khalsa / Mike Deol as Killer Khalsa
Jolly Bader as Rahul's ghostly Daddy ji
Akshaye Khanna as himself

Music

The music, which is composed by Sandeep Chowta, received good reviews.

Reception

Critical response

Bollywood/Hollywood was met with "mixed reviews", and has a rating of 41% on review aggregator Rotten Tomatoes, based on 46 reviews.

Accolades
At the 23rd Genie Awards, presented in February 2003, the film received five nominations: Best Motion Picture, Best Original Screenplay (Deepa Mehta), Best Actor in a Supporting Role (Ranjit Chowdhry), and Best Actress in a Supporting Role (Dina Pathak) and (Moushmi Chatterji). Mehta won the Genie for Best Original Screenplay.

Bollywood/Hollywood also won the Student Jury Award at the Newport International Film Festival, the Audience Award (Best Comedy)
at the Sarasota Film Festival, and the Best Director (Canadian Film) at the Vancouver Film Critics Circle.

References

External links
 

2002 films
English-language Canadian films
2000s Hindi-language films
Canadian romantic comedy films
Films set in Toronto
Films shot in Toronto
Films directed by Deepa Mehta
2002 romantic comedy films
2002 multilingual films
Canadian multilingual films
Films about women in the Indian diaspora
Films about Indian Canadians
2000s Canadian films